Muhammad Irwan Shah Bin Arismail (born 2 November 1988) is a Singaporean footballer who plays as a full-back for Singapore Premier League club Hougang United and the Singapore national team.

Irwan Shah is the first Singaporean player to win the AFF Suzuki Cup, Malaysian Super League, and S. League in 3 consecutive seasons (2012–2014).

Irwan Shah scored his first goal for Tampines Rovers FC in a friendly match against Terengganu FA on 14 January 2017

Honours

Club

LionsXII
 Malaysia Super League: 2013

Warriors FC
 Great Eastern Yeo's S.League: 2014

Tampines Rovers FC
 Komoco Motors Singapore Cup: 2019

International
Singapore
 AFF Championship: 2012

Club statistics

Others

Singapore Selection Squad
He was selected as part of the Singapore Selection squad for The Sultan of Selangor's Cup to be held on 24 August 2019.

References

https://web.archive.org/web/20160304190508/http://www.fas.org.sg/news/shaiful-my-biggest-enemy-also-my-motivation
https://web.archive.org/web/20120204212716/http://www.lionsxii.sg/player/profile/id/5

Living people
1988 births
Singaporean footballers
Singapore international footballers
Association football fullbacks
LionsXII players
Warriors FC players
Singapore Premier League players
Malaysia Super League players
Young Lions FC players
Singaporean people of Malay descent
Southeast Asian Games bronze medalists for Singapore
Southeast Asian Games medalists in football
Competitors at the 2009 Southeast Asian Games